Paks is a small town in Tolna county, in the south of Hungary, on the right bank of the Danube River, 100 km south of Budapest. Paks as a former agricultural settlement is now the home of the only Hungarian nuclear power plant, which provides about 40% of the country's electricity consumption.

History 
The settlement was already inhabited in ancient times. It has played a role in the Ottoman Empire times and during Rákóczi's War of Independence. In the Budapest offensive in the final stages of the Second World War, Soviet troops occupied the town at great cost, followed by four decades of communist rule. Meanwhile, it was famous for its cannery, wine and fish soup. The country's only nuclear power plant was built in Paks in the 1980s, the final decade of Soviet rule within the country.

Description 
In the 19th century, several mansions were built in the center of the old town, such as those in Szent István Tér, the main square of the town. The Catholic three-isled, basilica style Sacred Heart church was consecrated in 1901. There is a tablet in the wall of the baroque Szeniczey mansion to commemorate Ferenc Deák, 'the Sage of the Country'. The Town Museum is housed in the former Cseh-Vigyázó mansion. The Calvinist and the Lutheran churches were built in 1775 and 1884 respectively.

The Catholic Holy Spirit church, built according to the design of Imre Makovecz is considered to be an outstanding work of 20th-century architecture. There is a hundred-year-old chestnut alley lining the walkway on the Danube River bank. The town hosts the Spring Festival at Whitsuntide and the International Festival of Blues, Jazz, Rock and Gastronomy.

Sport 
Paksi FC is a Hungarian football club based in Paks.

Atomerőmű SE is a Hungarian basketball club based in Paks.

Bronze Age hoard 
A Bronze Age gold hoard of jewelry was found between Paks and Dunaföldvár on the right bank of the Danube in the 19th century. The treasure is now in the collections of the British Museum.

Twin towns – sister cities

Paks is twinned with:

 Galanta, Slovakia
 Gornji Vakuf-Uskoplje, Bosnia and Herzegovina

 Loviisa, Finland
 Novovoronezh, Russia
 Reichertshofen, Germany
 Târgu Secuiesc Romania
 Vyshkovo, Ukraine

See also 
Forró for another Bronze Age hoard from Hungary
Zsujta for a Bronze Age hoard from northern Hungary

References

External links 

  in Hungarian, English and Russian
 The jewish community in Paks On JewishGen website.

Populated places in Tolna County
Socialist planned cities
Planned cities in Hungary
Jewish communities in Hungary
Jewish communities destroyed in the Holocaust